The Community of European Railway and Infrastructure Companies (CER) brings together 75 railway undertakings and infrastructure companies from the European Union, the candidate countries (North Macedonia and Turkey) as well as from the Western Balkan countries, Norway, and Switzerland.

The CER is also a member of the Group of Representative Bodies.

Purpose
It is based in Brussels and represents its members’ interests vis-à-vis the European Parliament, European Commission and European Council of Ministers as well as other policy makers and transport actors.

The CER's main focus is promoting the development of rail as essential to the creation of a sustainable transport system which is both efficient and environmentally sound. A key priority in this respect for the CER is the achievement of a more balanced modal split in the transport system, minimising external costs arising to society and improving economic efficiency. In parallel to the railways’ own initiatives for improving the quality of rail services, the CER sees ensuring sufficient investment in infrastructure rail projects as a prerequisite for achieving the desire modal split.

Areas of Interest
All policy areas of significance to railway transport are dealt with by the CER, which offers advice and recommendations to European policy makers. The CER monitors and contributes to railway policy making. Its interests span the whole spectrum of European transport policy: infrastructure planning, passenger and freight services, public service, the environment, research and development and social dialogue.

Members

See also 
The European Railway Award

References

External links
Official CER website

Railway associations
International rail transport organizations
Rail transport in Europe